One ship and one shore establishment of Royal Australian Navy (RAN) have been named HMAS Cairns, for the city of Cairns, Queensland.

, a Bathurst-class corvette launched in 1941 and transferred to the Royal Netherlands Navy in 1946
, the RAN's minor war vessel base located in the city of the same name, which was opened in 1974 and is active as of 2016

Battle honours
Four battle honours have been awarded to HMAS Cairns:
 Pacific 1942–45
 Indian Ocean 1942–45
 Sicily 1943
 Okinawa 1945

References

Royal Australian Navy ship names